Mike Pletch (born 12 April 1983) is a Canadian rugby union player, who plays for the Canada national rugby team. He plays as a hooker. Pletch, along with his identical twin brother Dan, was in the Canada squad for the 2007 World Cup. He is a graduate of McMaster University with a degree in Civil Engineering and Management.

References
scrum.com stats
rugbycanada profile

1983 births
Rugby union hookers
Rugby union props
Canadian rugby union players
Sportspeople from Ontario
Living people
Canada international rugby union players
Canadian twins
Twin sportspeople